Ilia Alexandrovich Kulik (born 23 May 1977) is a Russian figure skater. He is the 1998 Olympic Champion, the 1995 European Champion, the 1997–1998 Grand Prix Final champion, and the 1995 World Junior champion.

Career
Kulik began skating at the age of five. In November 1994, he won the 1995 World Junior title and then, a few months later, the 1995 European title, at the age of 17. He was ninth at his first senior World Championships. The next season, he won silver at the 1996 World Championships. During the 1997-98 season, Kulik won gold at the 1997 NHK Trophy and silver at the 1997 Skate Canada International to qualify for the Champion Series Final (now known as the Grand Prix Final) where he won the gold medal. He also won the Russian national title but missed the 1998 European Championships as a result of back problems. At the 1998 Olympics, Kulik placed first in both the short and long programs and won the Olympic title at the age of 20 years and 267 days, became one of the youngest male figure skating Olympic champions.

Kulik withdrew from the 1998 World Championships due to his recurring back injury. He retired from competitive skating and has focused on performing in shows. Kulik has skated with the Stars on Ice tour, shows in Russia, the 2009 Ice All Stars, the 2010 Festa On Ice. In 1999, he skated a duet with his wife, Ekaterina Gordeeva.

Kulik also ventured briefly into acting, playing the role of Sergei, a Russian dancer, in the 2000 ballet-themed movie Center Stage.

In 2012, Kulik and Gordeeva opened a skating rink in Lake Forest, California.

Kulik was the former coach of Michael Christian Martinez.

Personal life
Kulik has one sibling, sister Svetlana, who also lives in California. His parents live in Russia.

Kulik married Ekaterina Gordeeva in San Francisco on 10 June 2002. They have one daughter,  Elizaveta Ilinichna Kulik (born 15 June 2001). Gordeeva has another daughter, Daria Sergeevna Grinkova (born 11 September 1992), from her first marriage to her late husband and skating partner, Sergei Grinkov. The family lived in California for several years before moving to Avon, Connecticut, in 2003. They returned to the Los Angeles area in the summer of 2007 and resided in Newport Beach. According to People magazine's 2018 Special Edition "The Best of Olympic Figure Skating", Gordeeva and Kulik divorced in 2016.

Programs

Post–1998

(with Ekaterina Gordeeva)

Pre–1998

Competitive highlights

References

External links

Official Fan Club

Navigation

Russian male single skaters
Figure skaters at the 1998 Winter Olympics
Olympic figure skaters of Russia
Olympic gold medalists for Russia
1977 births
Living people
Figure skaters from Moscow
Olympic medalists in figure skating
World Figure Skating Championships medalists
European Figure Skating Championships medalists
World Junior Figure Skating Championships medalists
Medalists at the 1998 Winter Olympics
20th-century Russian people
21st-century Russian people